Álvaro Gonçalves Pereira, Prior of Crato, was born to Gonçalo (Gonçalves) Pereira, 97th Archbishop of Braga (1326-1349) and Teresa Peres Vilarinho. At a very young age, he entered the Order of St. John of the Hospitallers. At Rhodes, at the time seat of the Order, he fought the Turks in the galleys of the Hospitallers so proving his worth that the Grand Master made him Prior of the Hospitallers in Portugal. There he founded the Castle of Amieira, the palaces of Bonjardim and the Monastery of Flor da Rosa, near Crato, the seat of the Order in Portugal. He administered the Order with great zeal and won a brilliant victory at Salado. He was one of the eminent figures of the reigns of Kings Afonso IV, Peter I and Ferdinand I. He died at an advanced age ca 1375. He was the father of the Constable of Portugal, Nuno Álvares Pereira.

Offspring
Marriage was prohibited by his order, but he had 32 children, including: Pedro Álvares Pereira, Prior of Crato and Master of Calatrava who died at the Battle of Aljubarrota fighting for King John I of Castile in 1385; Nuno Álvares Pereira; Rodrigo Álvares Pereira, legitimized by King Peter I of Portugal and one of the most respected noblemen under Portuguese Kings Peter I, Ferdinand I and John I, and Diogo Álvares Pereira, Prior of the Order of St. John

References
 António da Costa de Albuquerque de Sousa Lara, 2nd Count de Guedes, Vasco de Bettencourt de Faria Machado e Sampaio and Marcelo Olavo Correia de Azevedo, Ascendências Reais de Sua Alteza Real a Senhora Dona Isabel de Herédia Duquesa de Bragança, I, pelos Costados Herédia, Bettencourt e Meneses da Ilha da Madeira" (Universitária Editora, 1999)
 Manuel José da Costa Felgueiras Gaio, Nobiliário das Famílias de Portugal, Título Pereiras
 Cristóvão Alão de Morais, Pedatura Lusitana, Pereiras

Knights of the Order of St John
1375 deaths
14th-century Portuguese people
People of the Reconquista
Year of birth unknown
People from Portalegre District